Mopidevi mandal is one of the 25 mandals in Krishna district of the Indian state of Andhra Pradesh. It is under the administration of Machilipatnam revenue division and the headquarters are located at Mopidevi. The mandal is bounded by Challapalli, Koduru and Avanigadda mandals.

Administration 
The mandal is partially a part of the Andhra Pradesh Capital Region under the jurisdiction of APCRDA.

Towns and villages 

 census, the mandal has 18 settlements and all are villages.

The settlements in the mandal are listed below:

Note: M-Municipality, †–Mandal headquarter

See also 
List of villages in Krishna district

References 

Mandals in Krishna district